Tip Toes is a 1927 British silent film comedy-drama, directed by Herbert Wilcox and starring Dorothy Gish and Will Rogers.  The film is a loose adaptation of the stage musical Tip-Toes, with the action transferred from Florida to London.

Plot
Tip Toes (Dorothy Gish) and her two partners Uncle Hen (Rogers) and Al (Nelson Keys) have a struggling music-hall act.  When they go for auditions, theatre managers are keen on Tip Toes as a solo, but do not want the men.  Tip Toes turns down offers to go it alone out of loyalty to her fellows.  In deep financial trouble, they decide as a last throw of the dice to book into a suite at a high-class hotel and put the story about that Tip Toes is a sophisticated heiress, while she tries to snag a wealthy gentleman.  Tip Toes attracts the interest of a young peer, but the plans of the trio are constantly on the point of being undermined as Hen and Al get into a series of scrapes.

Cast
 Dorothy Gish as Tip Toes Kaye
 Will Rogers as Uncle Hen Kaye
 Nelson Keys as Al Kaye
 Miles Mander as Rollo Stevens
 Dennis Hoey as Hotelier
 John Manners as Lord William Montgomery

Production
A writer was paid £2,000 to do a script but Wilcox threw it out. Paramount contributed only £20,000 of the production cost.

Reception
Tip Toes was the last in a four-picture deal between Wilcox and Paramount to star Gish in British films.  The earlier films (Nell Gwyn, London and Madame Pompadour) had all been relatively favourably received by contemporary critics; however Tip Toes appears to have attracted almost universally negative responses.  The Bioscope dismissed it as "feeble", while Variety accused the film of being "not only a libel on Americans, but on American vaudeville and its artists".

The film lost money.

Preservation status
No print of Tip Toes is known to survive, and the British Film Institute include it on their '"75 Most Wanted" list of missing British feature films.  It is considered of great potential interest to silent cinema historians, not only as a prestige production involving star names, but to assess whether it really was a disastrous misfire justifying its terrible reception, or whether a modern perspective would view the film more kindly.

References

External links 
 
 BFI 75 Most Wanted entry, with extensive notes

1927 films
British silent feature films
British comedy-drama films
British black-and-white films
Films directed by Herbert Wilcox
Lost British films
1927 comedy-drama films
Lost comedy-drama films
1927 lost films
1920s British films
Silent comedy-drama films
1920s English-language films